Amirhossein Pourmohammad (born May 24, 1998) is an Iranian football player  who played as a defender for Iranian club Havadar in the Persian Gulf Pro League.

Club career

Havadar
He made his debut for Havadar in 24th fixtures of 2019–20 Azadegan League against Sepidrood.

References

Living people
1998 births
Association football defenders
Iranian footballers
Esteghlal F.C. players
Havadar S.C. players